Yara van Kerkhof (born 31 May 1990) is a Dutch short track speed skater. She won the silver medal in the 500 m event at the 2018 Winter Olympics in Pyeongchang, South Korea.

Career
Van Kerkhof competed at the 2014 Winter Olympics for the Netherlands. In the 500 metres she was second in her heat, advancing to a quarter-final, where she finished third, not advancing. In the 1500 metres she again advanced out of the first round, but was fifth in her semi-final, not advancing. She also competed in the 1000 metres, finishing third in her heat. As a member of the Dutch 3000 metre relay team, she was disqualified in the heats, again not advancing. Her best individual finish was in the 500m, where she was 11th.

As of September 2014, van Kerkhof's best performance at the World Championships came in 2011, when she won a silver medal as a member of the Dutch 3000m relay team. She also won gold medals as a member of the Dutch relay team at the 2012, 2013 and 2014 European Championships.

As of September 2014, van Kerkhof has one ISU Short Track Speed Skating World Cup victory, as part of the relay team in 2012–13 at Dresden. She also has two other podium finishes with the relay team. Her top World Cup ranking is 11th, in the 1000 metres in 2013–14.

She is a sister of Sanne van Kerkhof, also an Olympic short track speed skater.

World Cup podiums

References

External links
 
 

1990 births
Living people
Dutch female short track speed skaters
Olympic short track speed skaters of the Netherlands
Olympic gold medalists for the Netherlands
Olympic silver medalists for the Netherlands
Olympic bronze medalists for the Netherlands
Olympic medalists in short track speed skating
Short track speed skaters at the 2014 Winter Olympics
Short track speed skaters at the 2018 Winter Olympics
Short track speed skaters at the 2022 Winter Olympics
Medalists at the 2018 Winter Olympics
Medalists at the 2022 Winter Olympics
World Short Track Speed Skating Championships medalists
People from Zoetermeer
Sportspeople from South Holland
20th-century Dutch women
21st-century Dutch women